Chartèves is a commune in the Aisne department in Hauts-de-France in northern France.

Population

Culture

Personalities
  (1872-1952) resided her
 Marie Drouet (1885-1963) was born in
 Léon Augustin Lhermitte (1844-1925) painted the landscapes of the village

.

See also
Communes of the Aisne department

References

Communes of Aisne
Aisne communes articles needing translation from French Wikipedia